Aktove Canyon is a canyon near the Aktove village, on the Mertvovod river in the Voznesenskyi region of Mykolaiv Oblast of Ukraine. It is a part of the regional landscape park Granite-steppe lands of Buh. It is also a well-known place of pilgrimage. In the past it was a separate reservation "Actove".

Aktove Canyon consists of ancient weathered granite, cut by Mertvovid river on the depth of more than 50 meters. Area of the canyon outreaches 250 hectares. Being a unique complex of granite rocks, boulders and water/steppe ecosystems, canyon is located on one of the oldest parts of Eurasian land.

The canyon is a part of the Buzk's Gard National Nature Park and the regional land park Granite-steppe lands of Buh.

Gallery

References

External links
 Top 7 Canyons in Ukraine
 Aktove Canyon...

Geography of Mykolaiv Oblast
Canyons and gorges of Ukraine